Astreopora scabra is a species of hard coral found in Eastern Australia, the oceanic west Pacific, Micronesia, Polynesia, Papua New Guinea and American Samoa. It is an uncommon species with a relatively smaller range than many pacific coral species. The International Union for Conservation of Nature has assessed its conservation status as being of "least concern".

References

Acroporidae
Cnidarians of the Pacific Ocean
Marine fauna of Oceania
Animals described in 1982